The Puerto Rican quail-dove (Geotrygon larva) is an extinct species of dove from the genus of quail-doves Geotrygon. It is only known by subfossil material from the Holocene.

Remains of the Puerto Rican quail-dove were unearthed in the  Cueva (cave)Clara and Cueva Catedral near Morovis, in the Cueva Toraño at Utuado, and in a kitchen midden near Mayagüez on Puerto Rico. The holotype, a tarsometatarsus, was discovered in July 1916 by zoologist Harold Elmer Anthony in the Cueva Clara.

According to Alexander Wetmore who described this species it was related to the grey-fronted quail-dove (Geotrygon caniceps), which occurs on Cuba. The tarsometatarsus of the Puerto Rican quail-dove, though,  is longer than in the grey-fronted quail-dove. Compared with the ruddy quail-dove (G. montana), which occurs on Puerto Rico, too, the tarsometatarsi are more slender.

The large amount of unearthed material led to the assumption that the Puerto Rican quail-dove might have been a common bird before the initial arrival of humans to the island.  Its extinction may have been due to deforestation.

References

Further reading
 Alexander Wetmore: Bird Remains from the Caves of Porto [sic] Rico In: Bulletin of the American Museum of Natural History No. 46, 1922:p 316–317
 Alexander Wetmore: An Additional Record for the Extinct Porto Rican Quail-Dove In: Auk Vol. 40 (2), 1923:p 324
 Alexander Wetmore: Scientific Survey of Porto Rico and the Virgin Islands. Vol. 9, pts. 1–4. New York Academy of Sciences, 1927, p 405–406
 Michael Walters & Julian Pender Hume: Extinct Birds. Poiser Monographes (A & C Black), 2012. . p 147.

Puerto Rican quail-dove
†
Extinct birds of the Caribbean
Late Quaternary prehistoric birds
Quaternary birds of North America
Holocene extinctions
Puerto Rican quail-dove
Taxa named by Alexander Wetmore